Peter Ross Awdry Gray  joined the Bar in Gray's Inn, London, in 1972 he joined the Victorian Bar and then became a judge of the Federal Court of Australia serving from 17 May 1984 until 17 May 2013. Peter was the youngest person ever appointed to the Federal Court of Australia and at 29 years its longest ever serving member.  During his time at the court Peter delivered over 1,700 decisions.  Justice Gray's main focus has been on labour law. and the law and its impact on Aboriginal Australians. After retirement Peter was for a time an adjunct professor at Deakin University and is now an Honorary Professor at Monash University.

Judiciary 
Gray held the following roles in the Judiciary:
 Judge of the Federal Court of Australia, 
 Judge of the Industrial Relations Court of Australia, 
 Presidential Member of the Administrative Appeals Tribunal, 
 Deputy President of the National Native Title Tribunal, 
 Aboriginal Land Commissioner

References 

Judges of the Federal Court of Australia
Living people
Judges of the Industrial Relations Court of Australia
20th-century Australian judges
21st-century Australian judges
Members of the Order of Australia
Year of birth missing (living people)